Windy & Carl is an American ambient duo based in Dearborn, Michigan, United States.

Overview
Cited as "a leading light of the Michigan space-rock scene" by AllMusic, the minimalist group formed in 1993 around the core husband-and-wife duo of guitarist Carl Hultgren and bassist/singer Windy Weber. (Most of the band's pieces feature no vocals, however.)  The band was prolific from the outset up to 2001, whereupon they took a hiatus of a few years.

The music of Windy & Carl borrows heavily from the sounds of 1980s era bands on 4AD Records, specifically that of Robin Guthrie of the Cocteau Twins and various other dream pop and shoegazer acts.

Unlike noteworthy prior drone/ambient artists (such as Cluster, Brian Eno, Popol Vuh, et al.), Windy & Carl's drones are primarily derived from guitar, particularly via usage of delay effects, reverb effects, and E-Bow, rather than synthesizers.  Another noteworthy aspect of W&C's sound is the absence of drums.

History
"Hultgren first began recording instrumental guitar drone pieces in 1992, when he self-released a cassette tape named Portal before teaming up with Weber". It was later reissued on CD by BaDaBing owner Ben Goldberg.  
Windy & Carl then participated in Darla Records' Bliss Out Series in 1997, contributing the maxi-EP Antarctica.  That year, they also issued the limited-edition album/maxi-EP A Dream of Blue on U.K. label Ochre Records, with individually painted cover art by Weber (on the 10" vinyl version). Depths was released by Kranky in early 1998.

In 1999, the couple teamed up with synthesist Greg Gasiorowski to record under the name Five Way Mirror. They released a few singles under that moniker, in addition to Transcendence, a 1999 full-length album.  Consciousness came out on Kranky in 2001.  The band then went on hiatus (after Weber's mom died), returning with Dream House/ Dedications to Flea in 2005. (Flea was their recently deceased dog.) There was a singles compilation released in 2001, Introspection, which is 3 CDs of singles, live tracks and previously unreleased recordings.

In 2006, they released Akimatsuri, a one track (33:16 min) limited album under their label Blue Flea. It was recorded at their home between March and October 2006. The unique track is made up of 5 subtracks.

Windy & Carl have been a mainstay of the various Terrastock music festivals. In the fall of 2000 they released a CD with The Lothars, titled & Windy & Carl & The Lothars that featured live performances by each band from the San Francisco Terrastock festival as well as a 28-minute collaborative piece recorded at the London Terrastock festival.

The group has issued several other split recordings as well as a 3-CD box set, Introspection: Singles & Rarities 1993-2000. They embarked on a national tour in the summer of 2001 with Landing; the bands released a split tour-only EP to commemorate it. A highlight of this tour was being able to perform a private audience show for Sonic Youth.

October 2008 saw the release of Songs for the Broken Hearted – their 4th album in 11 years for Kranky. In December 2008, American webzine Somewhere Cold ranked Songs for the Broken Hearted No. 5 on their 2008 Somewhere Cold Awards Hall of Fame.

Hultgren and Weber ran a record store in Dearborn, called Stormy Records, until it shut down permanently.

Windy & Carl's influence can be heard in bands such as Landing, The Sight Below, Kranky labelmates White Rainbow, Growing, and Yume Bitsu.

Discography

Albums
 Portal (Ba Da Bing!, 1995)
 Drawing of Sound (Icon, 1996)
 Antarctica (Darla, 1997)
 Depths (Kranky, 1998)
 Dream of Blue (Ochre, 1998)
 Consciousness (Kranky, 2001)
 Dedications to Flea (Brainwashed, 2005)
 The Dream House (Kranky, 2005)
 Songs for the Broken Hearted (Kranky, 2008)
 Instrumentals for the Broken Hearted (Blue Flea, 2009)
 We Will Always Be (Kranky, 2012)
 Blues for a UFO (2017)
 Allegiance and Conviction (Kranky, 2020)

EPs and singles
 Watersong/Dragonfly (Blue Flea, 1993)
 Instrumentals EP (Burnt Hair Records, 1994)
 Left Without Air (split single with Füxa) (Blue Flea/Mind Expansion, 1995)
 Green (split single with Hopewell) (Burnt Hair Records, 1996)
 Emeralds/Fragments Of Time And Space (Enraptured, 1996)
 Christmas Song (split single with Grimble Grumble) (Enraptured, 1996)
 Crazy in the Sun (split single with Silver Apples) (Rocket Girl, 1997)
 Dream of Blue/Kate EP (Ochre, 1997)
 Near and Far (split EP with Amp) (Blue Flea, 1998)
 Noises from the Darkroom (split 12" with Saddar Bazaar) (Earworm, 2001)
 Untitled (split tour CD with Landing (Music Fellowship, 2001)
 Akimatsuri (Blue Flea, 2006)
 Intelligence in Evolution (split LP with Heavy Winged) (Music Fellowship, 2008)
 You Can't Hide Your Love Forever vol. 7 (Dwight Yoakam cover) (Geographic North, 2012)
 Calliope (The Great Pop Supplement, 2013)
 I Walked Alone/At Night (Blue Flea, 2014)
 Forest Trails (2019)

Compilation
Introspection (Blue Flea, 2002) (3 CDs of rarities, live tracks, etc.)

Various-artist compilation appearances
 "Seiche" on Brainwaves (2006)
 "3rd Stage" (live collaboration with The Lothars), "Through the Portal" (live), and "Ballast" (live) on & Windy & Carl & The Lothars (2000)
 "Beyond Asleep" on Disco Sucks (compilation) (1996)

References

External links

Windy & Carl at Bandcamp
Windy & Carl at Kranky
Windy & Carl at Brainwashed
Songs to Live & Drown In: 10 Questions with Windy & Carl on Perfect Sound Forever (2013)

Rock music groups from Michigan
American space rock musical groups
Dream pop musical groups
Musical groups established in 1993
American ambient music groups
Male–female musical duos
Rocket Girl artists
Drone music groups
Darla Records artists